Night aviation regulations in the United States are administered and enforced by the Federal Aviation Administration (FAA). Unlike many countries, the United States places no special restrictions on VFR flying at night.

Definitions
Three different concepts of "night" are referred to in the Federal Aviation Regulations in the US. These include the periods from
sunset to sunrise,
 the end of evening civil twilight to the beginning of morning civil twilight (this is the "standard definition of night", given in FAR Section 1.1),
 one hour after sunset to one hour before sunrise.

These uses of night are listed in order of increasing restrictiveness. The end of evening civil twilight generally occurs less than one hour after sunset. AirNav is a good source for sunset and sunrise and evening civil twilight and morning civil twilight.

Pilot currency 
Pilots are required to maintain night currency every 90 days to carry passengers at night. Specifically, 61.57(b) states that  "...no person may act as pilot in command of an aircraft carrying passengers during the period beginning 1 hour after sunset and ending 1 hour before sunrise, unless within the preceding 90 days that person has made at least three takeoffs and three landings to a full stop during the period beginning 1 hour after sunset and ending 1 hour before sunrise, and—

 That person acted as sole manipulator of the flight controls; and
 The required takeoffs and landings were performed in an aircraft of the same category, class, and type (if a type rating is required)."

Recency and Equipment Requirements 
 To log night hours, one uses the standard definition of night, given in FAR Section 1.1. 
 Takeoffs and landings required to fulfill the recency requirements of FAR 61.57 must be conducted between one hour after sunset, and one hour before sunrise. 
 Restrictions on carrying passengers also refers to the period from one hour after sunset to one hour before sunrise. 
 The "night" restriction on Special VFR clearances, namely that the pilot and aircraft are rated and equipped for IFR, applies from sunset to sunrise, see AIM 4-4-6(g). 
 Position lights are required from sunset to sunrise (see FAR 91.209 and AIM 4-3-23). 
 Additional equipment required for VFR flight during the standard definition of night is given in FAR 91.205c, and summarized by the FLAPS mnemonic: 
Fuses
 Landing light (if for hire) 
 Anti-collision lights (beacon, strobe) 
 Position lights 
 Source of electricity

References

External links 
 Sunrise/Sunset Tables
 Sun Cult Firefox Add-on
 Night Times and Definitions Look-up

Aviation in the United States
Aviation law
Night flying